The 300 Club is a small number of individuals who have endured a temperature difference of  within minutes. The group originated at Amundsen-Scott South Pole Station in Antarctica and has since been established in North America.

 
This can happen in April to September (see South Pole). Then they quickly walk naked to the Ceremonial South Pole wearing only boots. They walk around the marker and return to the station. 
Participants  move fast enough to minimize frostbite, but not so fast that they inhale so much cold air that they freeze their airway and lungs; properly clothed bystanders are often present to provide help if needed.
After this, participants usually warm up in the sauna again, often with the aid of alcoholic beverages. After joining the 300 Club, members are entitled to wear commemorative patches.

The first 300 Club outside of Antarctica was established on January 30, 2019 near Minneapolis, Minnesota during a polar vortex. Upon exiting the sauna, they sprinted around a flagpole planted in honor of the South Pole tradition and took a brief roll in the snow before returning to the sauna.

In popular culture 
Dr. John Bird's award-winning book, One Day, One Night: Portraits of the South Pole chronicles life and science at the station, including the 300 Club.

The 200 Club 

See also
 Polar bear plunge
 Line-crossing ceremony

References

External links
 South Pole experiences warmest year on record in 2009.
 Account of the 300 club by researchers stationed at the South Pole.
 Travel account of entering the 300 club.
 300 Club

Rites of passage
United States Antarctic Program